The 2011 Canadian Mixed Curling Championship was held November 13–20, 2010 at the Morris Curling Club in Morris, Manitoba. Prince Edward Island won its third mixed title, defeating Manitoba in the final. P.E.I. skip Robert Campbell won his second Mixed championship.

Morris was the smallest community to ever host a Canadian national curling championship.

Teams
The event had many past champions involved. Alberta was skipped by Tim Krassman, who won the event with Dean Ross in 2008. Nova Scotia was skipped by Paul Flemming, who won the event in 1999 and 2003. PEI was skipped by Robert Campbell, who won the event in 1989.

The event also included 1987 Canadian Junior champion Charlie Sullivan of New Brunswick and five-time Territorial champion Steve Moss.

Standings

Results
Draw 1, November 13, 18:30

Draw 2, November 14, 09:30

Draw 3, November 14, 14:00

Draw 4, November 14, 18:30

Draw 5, November 15, 9:30

Draw 6, November 15, 14:00

Draw 7, November 15, 18:30

Draw 8, November 16, 9:30

Draw 9, November 16, 14:00

Draw 10, November 16, 18:30

Draw 11, November 17, 9:30

Draw 12, November 17, 14:00

Draw 13, November 17, 18:30

Draw 14, November 18, 9:30

Draw 15, November 18, 14:00

Draw 16, November 18, 18:30

Draw 17, November 19, 9:00

Playoffs

Tie breaker #1, November 19, 14:30

Tiebreaker #2, November 19, 19:00

Semi-final, November 20, 9:00

Final, November 20, 13:30

External links
Official site

References

Canadian Mixed Curling Championship
Mixed Curling Championship
Canadian Mixed Curling Championship
Mixed Curling Championship
Curling in Manitoba
Pembina Valley Region